Major-General Walter Tuckfield Goldsworthy  (8 May 1837 – 13 October 1911) was a British Army officer and a Conservative Party politician.

Goldsworthy was born in Marylebone, London.  He travelled to India with his father, setting up a merchant business in Calcutta in 1854 and, together with his brother Sir Roger Tuckfield Goldsworthy (1839–1900), he joined the volunteer cavalry known as Havelock's Irregulars.  During the Indian Mutiny of 1857, he won medals and was mentioned in dispatches. He was later commissioned into the 8th Hussars. In 1859 he was promoted lieutenant without purchase. In 1864, as a captain, he exchanged into the 91st Foot. In 1866 he was promoted brevet major and in 1868 he became a full major on half-pay. In 1874, still on half-pay, he was promoted brevet lieutenant-colonel and in 1880 brevet colonel. In 1882 he became lieutenant-colonel in the Essex Regiment. He was later promoted major general. In 1897 Goldsworthy was receiving £ 466 per annum from the Indian revenues from annuities subscribed to while on service in India.

Goldsworthy was elected Member of Parliament for Hammersmith in the 1885 general election and held the seat until the 1900 general election.

In March 1886 Goldsworthy presented a petition to Parliament asking to extend the voting franchise to women.

He is credited with a donation of £105 to the Chelsea and Westminster Hospital in 1892.

In 1890, the  Yaldham Manor, Kent was advertised in The Times and sold to Goldsworthy.  He bred hunters and built the stables and carriage shed.  Arthur Nye Peckham, who visited Yaldham in 1911 noted the general had "re-opened the great hall, which had been cut into four rooms".

References

External links 
 

1837 births
1911 deaths
Military personnel from London
People from Marylebone
British Army major generals
Companions of the Order of the Bath
8th King's Royal Irish Hussars officers
Argyll and Sutherland Highlanders officers
Essex Regiment officers
Conservative Party (UK) MPs for English constituencies
UK MPs 1885–1886
UK MPs 1886–1892
UK MPs 1892–1895
UK MPs 1895–1900